Steinar Ryen Strømnes (born 19 March 1987) is a Norwegian footballer who plays for HamKam.

He hails from Roa, and moved from minnows Hadeland to top-tier Vålerenga in 2003. He enrolled at Wang Upper Secondary School and played for Vålerenga's youth team. He featured for the senior team as a half-time substitute in the 2005 Norwegian Football Cup—in a 10–2 thrashing of Hadeland—and started both legs in the 2005-06 UEFA Cup campaign against Steaua Bucuresti. In September 2006 he made his Norwegian Premier League debut against Start. He also made his debut for the Norway national under-21 football team.

In the spring of 2007 he was loaned out to HamKam, and in the summer he was loaned out to Kongsvinger. Ahead of the 2008 season he joined Kongsvinger permanently. Featuring scarcely in the 2009 Norwegian Premier League campaign, he went on to Lyn. However, the club went bankrupt after ten matches of the 2010 Norwegian First Division and Strømnes moved to Sweden and Åtvidaberg.

From 2012 to 2017 he played for Strømmen, amassing 166 league games and captaining the team. In December 2017 he moved to Bekkestua and soon after joined Stabæk.

Career statistics

Club

References

1987 births
Living people
People from Lunner
Norwegian footballers
Norway youth international footballers
Norway under-21 international footballers
Eliteserien players
Norwegian First Division players
Allsvenskan players
Superettan players
Vålerenga Fotball players
Hamarkameratene players
Kongsvinger IL Toppfotball players
Lyn Fotball players
Åtvidabergs FF players
Strømmen IF players
Stabæk Fotball players
Norwegian expatriate footballers
Expatriate footballers in Sweden
Norwegian expatriate sportspeople in Sweden
Association football defenders
Sportspeople from Innlandet